The Adam-Derby House is a notable 19th-century house, designed in the Queen Anne style, located at 166 Lexington Avenue in Oyster Bay, Nassau County, New York.

Description and history 
It was built in 1878 and designed by architects William Appleton Potter (1842-1909) and Robert Henderson Robertson (1849-1919) during their partnership as Potter & Robertson. From 1914 to 1977, it was the home of Ethel Roosevelt Derby (1891-1977), daughter of President Theodore Roosevelt. It is a two and one half to three story dwelling with a wood exterior resting on a brick foundation in the Queen Anne style. It features a variety of exterior detailing and turned post supports supporting the bracketed roofs of the verandahs, porches, and porte cochere.

It was listed on the National Register of Historic Places on May 17, 1979.

References

Houses on the National Register of Historic Places in New York (state)
Queen Anne architecture in New York (state)
Houses completed in 1878
Houses in Nassau County, New York
National Register of Historic Places in Oyster Bay (town), New York